Jugular foramen syndrome, or Vernet's syndrome, is characterized by paresis of the glossopharyngeal, vagal, and accessory (with or without the hypoglossal) nerves.

Symptoms 
Symptoms of this syndrome are consequences of this paresis. As such, an affected patient may show:
 dysphonia/hoarseness
 soft palate dropping
 deviation of the uvula towards the normal side
 dysphagia
 loss of sensory function from the posterior 1/3 of the tongue (CN IX)
 decrease in the parotid gland secretion (CN IX)
 loss of gag reflex
 sternocleidomastoid and trapezius muscles paresis (CN XI)

Causes 
 Glomus tumors (most frequently)
 Meningiomas
 Schwannomas (Acoustic neuroma)
 Metastatic tumors located at the cerebellopontine angle
 Trauma
 Fracture of occipital bone
 Infections
 Cholesteatoma (very rare)
 Obstruction of the jugular foramen due to bone diseases
 Nasopharyngeal carcinoma spreading into the parapharyngeal space involving the ninth, tenth, and eleventh cranial nerves

Diagnosis
 Gadolinium enhanced mri for vestibular schwannoma
 mri and biopsy for nasopharyngeal carcinoma
 based on nerve palsies
 NCCT for occipital bone fracture

References 

Syndromes affecting the nervous system
Glossopharyngeal nerve
Vagus nerve
Accessory nerve